Tenbury Wells railway station was a station in Burford, Shropshire, England. Serving the town of Tenbury Wells across the River Teme in Worcestershire, the station was opened in 1861 and closed in 1962.

The station was named "Tenbury" at opening on 1 August 1861.

The station was renamed "Tenbury Wells" on 14 November 1912. The former Tenbury Railway closed on 31 July 1961, but Tenbury Wells Station remained in use for passenger traffic to Bewdley until 1 August 1962.

Tenbury Station was demolished and factory units built on its site, Wells drinks occupied the site before being sold to Kerry Foods.

References

Further reading

Disused railway stations in Shropshire
Railway stations in Great Britain opened in 1861
Railway stations in Great Britain closed in 1962
Former Great Western Railway stations